Lieutenant General Hugh Royds Stokes Massy  (5 January 1884 – 21 May 1965) was a British Army officer who served during the First and Second World Wars.

Military career
Educated at Bradfield College and the Royal Military Academy, Woolwich, Massy was commissioned into the Royal Artillery in 1902. He served with the West African Frontier Force from 1907 and then became Adjutant for 4th East Lancashire Brigade in 1913.

He served in the First World War, initially as a staff officer in the Mediterranean Expeditionary Force and then as a Brigade Major in France.

After the war he attended the Staff College, Camberley in 1919 and became a brigade major with Irish Command in 1920 and then went to India, initially as a staff officer, and then as an instructor at the Staff College, Quetta. After attending the Imperial Defence College in 1930, he was an instructor at the Senior Officers' School, Belgaum from 1932 and then became a brigadier with Southern Command in 1934. He was appointed Director of Military Training at the War Office in 1938.

He served in the Second World War, initially as Deputy Chief of Imperial General Staff and then as Commander-in-Chief of the North West Expeditionary Force to Central Norway in 1940; he went on to command XI Corps in East Anglia from July 1940 to November 1941 and retired in 1943.

He was also Colonel Commandant of the Royal Artillery from 1945 to 1951.

He was High Sheriff of Pembrokeshire in 1946.

Family
In 1912 he married Maud Ina Nest Roch. They had one son and one daughter.

References

Bibliography

External links
British Army Officers 1939−1945
Generals of World War II

|-

1884 births
1965 deaths
Academics of the Staff College, Quetta
British Army generals of World War II
British Army personnel of World War I
People educated at Bradfield College
Companions of the Order of the Bath
Companions of the Distinguished Service Order
Recipients of the Military Cross
High Sheriffs of Pembrokeshire
Royal West African Frontier Force officers
Royal Artillery officers
Graduates of the Royal Military Academy, Woolwich
Graduates of the Staff College, Camberley
Graduates of the Royal College of Defence Studies
British Army lieutenant generals
Military personnel from Pembrokeshire